Pallidol is a resveratrol dimer. It can be found in red wine, in Cissus pallida or in Parthenocissus laetevirens.

References

External links 
 Pallidol on www.phenol-explorer.eu

Resveratrol oligomers
Stilbenoid dimers
Wine chemistry